Ironworker is a class of machine that can shear, notch, and punch holes in steel plate and profiles. The name is now used to refer to the whole class of machines (made by at least a dozen brands, including Edwards). If there ever was a brand name, it has now become a genericized trademark. Ironworkers generate force using mechanical advantage or hydraulic systems.

Overview
Modern systems use hydraulic rams powered by a heavy alternating current electric motor.  High strength carbon steel blades and dies of various shapes are used to work the metal. The machine itself is made of very heavy steel to handle the enormous force that can be generated during use.  Ironworkers are rated according to the force they can generate in tons; ratings usually start at 20 tons and go as high as 220 tons.
Mechanical ironworkers are mostly used in productions with low temperature in winter (up to ) and are considered to be faster. Another reason to choose the mechanical construction is when cutting of large profiles (up to 300 mm (12 in) and bigger) is needed. Most hydraulicals can't cut this size. The disadvantages are the higher power consumption (sometimes double for the same job), the noise and the safety concerns.

Safety
Ironworkers are built with safety in mind, but they still present hazards that must be addressed and thoroughly thought out before they are purchased. Most of them have at least 4 stations that require boundaries around them to safely produce parts. They can shear flat plate, angle iron, round and square bar stock as well as punch plates, angles, I-beam and channel iron. Some have a station for notching and forming of different materials. The area around each station should be at least 20 feet since that is the common stock length of most materials used on ironworkers.

Operations
Operations which can be performed include:
 Forming or bending
 Notching
 Punching 
 Shearing

Advantages
Due to the reduction in the amount of man hours and effort needed to cut or punch steel sections, an ironworker is often an integral part of commercial manufacturing facilities and fabrication shops. They are easily re-tooled for various operations and can be operated by one person.

References

Metalworking cutting tools
Fabrication (metal)